Mathis Jan Holcbecher (born 21 January 2001) is a Swiss professional footballer who plays as a midfielder for Servette U21 in the fifth-tier 2. Liga Interregional.

Professional career
On 19 February 2019, Holcbecher signed a professional contract with Servette FC. Holcbecher made his professional debut with Servette FC in a 3–1 Swiss Super League loss to FC Lugano on 31 July 2020.

References

External links
 
 SFL Profile
 Servette Profile
 Bild Profile
 SFV U16 Profile
 SFV U17 Profile
 SFV U18 Profile

2001 births
Footballers from Geneva
Living people
Swiss men's footballers
Switzerland youth international footballers
Association football midfielders
Servette FC players
2. Liga Interregional players
Swiss Super League players